Bae Yong-joon (born August 29, 1972) is a South Korean businessman and former actor. He has starred in numerous television dramas, including, notably, Winter Sonata which became a major part of the Korean Wave. Bae retired from acting after 2007, but remains active as the chairman of management agency KeyEast.

Early life 
Bae Yong-joon was born in Mapo District, Seoul. He entered Sungkyunkwan University in 2000 as a Film Studies major.

Career 
Bae made his acting debut in 1994 in the Korean drama Salut D'Amour (lit. "Love Greeting"). The rookie actor quickly gained popularity, and a year later he won Best New Actor at the 1995 KBS Drama Awards for Our Sunny Days of Youth. Throughout the 1990s, Bae continued playing leading roles on television, in Papa (1996), First Love (1996) which reached a peak viewership rating of 65.8%, The Barefooted Youth (1998), and the Noh Hee-kyung-penned Did We Really Love? (1999). In Hotelier (2001), he played a mergers and acquisitions specialist about to takeover a hotel, but has a change of heart after falling in love with one of its employees (Bae would later reprise his role in a cameo in the 2007 Japanese remake of Hotelier).

But it was Yoon Seok-ho's Winter Sonata in 2002 that would transform Bae's career, and consequently the face of Korean dramas abroad. A melodrama about first love, lost memory and unknown family ties, Winter Sonata became an unprecedented success in Asia and more than 20 countries, particularly in Japan. Bae gained a tremendous fan base among Japanese middle-aged women, who dubbed him with the honorific nickname Yon-sama (cf.

In 2003, Bae was cast in his first major big-screen role in Untold Scandal (he had previously appeared in bit parts in two films in the 1990s). In contrast to his gentle, intellectual image, Bae played a conniving, sexually predatory nobleman in E J-yong's adaptation of Les Liaisons dangereuses set in 18th century Joseon. His performance received Best New Actor accolades from the Blue Dragon Film Awards and the Baeksang Arts Awards. He next published a photo book The Image: Volume 1 in 2004, which sold 10,000 copies.

Afterwards he worked with director Hur Jin-ho in April Snow (2005), about a stage lighting director who discovers his wife's infidelity when she becomes comatose after a near-fatal car accident with her lover.

Bae then entered the restaurant business, by establishing restaurants and cafes that capitalize on the well-being trend. He owns health food restaurant Gorilla in the Kitchen and high-end traditional Korean restaurant Gosire. As the most famous Korean actor in Japan, he became a proponent for Korean cuisine, and his Gosire lunchboxes (or bento) are sold in Japanese convenience stores and supermarkets. Most of the KeyEast executives, including president Bae Sung-woong, are Bae's former managers and have worked with him for more than ten years.

Bae made his much-anticipated return to television in 2007 in The Legend (also known as Taewangsasingi, lit. "The Four Guardian Gods of the King"). The big-budget period-fantasy epic was written by Song Ji-na and directed by Kim Jong-hak, and Bae played dual roles: Gwanggaeto, 19th ruler of the Goguryeo kingdom; and Hwanung, believed to be the son of God and founder of Gojoseon.

In 2009, Bae and Winter Sonata co-star Choi Ji-woo reunited as voice actors for the animated series Winter Sonata Anime, which aired in Japan. He also wrote a book of photo-essays A Journey in Search of Korea's Beauty, which promoted Korean traditional culture such as ceramics, liquor, hanbok, pansori, hanok, Hangul, kimchi-making, temple stays, museums and historical sites. It became a bestseller, and has been translated to Japanese, Taiwanese, Chinese and English. A Journey in Search of Korea's Beauty was later turned into an eight-episode TV documentary that aired on MBC Life in 2011.

In 2009 and 2010, he was the star of D3 Publisher's Nintendo DS edutainment series Bae Yong-joon to Manabu Kankokugo DS ("Learn Korean with Bae Yong-joon"), consisting of three games: Bae Yong-joon to Manabu Kankokugo DS (beginner level), Bae Yong-joon to Manabu Kankokugo DS Date Hen (intermediate level), and Bae Yong-joon to Manabu Kankokugo DS Test Hen (advanced level).

Bae and KeyEast entered into a joint partnership with Park Jin-young and JYP Entertainment in 2009, which eventually produced Dream High (2011), a teen musical series that revolved around the lives of students attending a high school for the performing arts. As creative producer, Bae supervised the screenplay and production; he also appeared in a four-episode guest arc. The collaboration between KeyEast and JYPE, named Holym, lasted until 2013.

Personal life

He and actress Park Soo-jin announced their engagement in May 2015 and married on July 27, 2015 at the Sheraton Grande Walkerhill Hotel. The couple only invited friends and relatives to the wedding and forbade attendance of the press media.

Filmography

Television series

Films

Music videos

Video games

Books

Awards and nominations

Listicles

See also 

 Contemporary culture of South Korea
 Korean Wave

References

External links 

  
  
 Bae Yong-joon at KeyEast 
 
 
 

 

South Korean male television actors
South Korean male film actors
South Korean male models
Male actors from Seoul
Recipients of the Order of Cultural Merit (Korea)
1972 births
Living people
Best New Actor Paeksang Arts Award (film) winners